Bollen may refer to:

Bollen (surname)
Böllen, a municipality of Germany
Bollén, a species of tree in the Rose family